Grand Teton National Park is an American national park in northwestern Wyoming. Along with surrounding national forests, these three protected areas constitute the almost  Greater Yellowstone Ecosystem, one of the world's largest intact mid-latitude temperate ecosystems.

The human history of the Grand Teton region dates back at least 11,000 years when the first nomadic hunter-gatherer Paleo-Indians began migrating into the region during warmer months to pursue food and supplies. In the early 19th century, the first white explorers encountered the eastern Shoshone natives. Between 1810 and 1840, the region attracted fur trading companies that vied for control of the lucrative beaver pelt trade. U.S. Government expeditions to the region commenced in the mid-19th century as an offshoot of exploration in Yellowstone, with the first permanent white settlers in Jackson Hole arriving in the 1880s.

Efforts to preserve the region as a national park began in the late 19th century, and in 1929 Grand Teton National Park was established, protecting the Teton Range's major peaks. The valley of Jackson Hole remained in private ownership until the 1930s when conservationists led by John D. Rockefeller Jr. began purchasing land in Jackson Hole to be added to the existing national park. Against public opinion and with repeated Congressional efforts to repeal the measures, much of Jackson Hole was set aside for protection as Jackson Hole National Monument in 1943. The monument was abolished in 1950 and most of the monument land was added to Grand Teton National Park.

Grand Teton National Park is named for Grand Teton, the tallest mountain in the Teton Range. The naming of the mountains is attributed to early 19th-century French-speaking trappers—les trois tétons (the three teats) was later anglicized and shortened to Tetons. The park has numerous lakes, including  Jackson Lake as well as streams of varying length and the upper main stem of the Snake River. Though in a state of recession, a dozen small glaciers persist at the higher elevations near the highest peaks in the range. Some of the rocks in the park are the oldest found in any American national park and have been dated at nearly 2.7 billion years.

Grand Teton National Park is an almost pristine ecosystem and the same species of flora and fauna that have existed since prehistoric times can still be found there. More than 1,000 species of vascular plants, dozens of species of mammals, 300 species of birds, more than a dozen fish species, and a few species of reptiles and amphibians inhabit the park. Due to various changes in the ecosystem, some of them human-induced, efforts have been made to provide enhanced protection to some species of native fish and the increasingly threatened whitebark pine.

Grand Teton National Park is a popular destination for mountaineering, hiking, fishing, and other forms of recreation. Noted for world-renowned trout fishing, the park is one of the few places to catch Snake River fine-spotted cutthroat trout. Grand Teton has several National Park Service–run visitor centers and privately operated concessions for motels, lodges, gas stations, and marinas.

Human history

Paleo-Indians and Native Americans

Paleo-Indian presence in what is now Grand Teton National Park dates back more than 11,000 years. Jackson Hole valley climate at that time was colder and more alpine than the semi-arid climate found today, and the first humans were migratory hunter-gatherers spending summer months in Jackson Hole and wintering in the valleys west of the Teton Range. Along the shores of Jackson Lake, fire pits, tools, and what are thought to have been fishing weights have been discovered. One of the tools found is of a type associated with the Clovis culture, and tools from this cultural period date back at least 11,500 years. Some of the tools are made of obsidian which chemical analysis indicates came from sources near present-day Teton Pass, south of Grand Teton National Park. Though obsidian was also available north of Jackson Hole, virtually all the obsidian spear points found are from a source to the south, indicating that the main seasonal migratory route for the Paleo-Indian was from this direction. Elk, which winter on the National Elk Refuge at the southern end of Jackson Hole and northwest  into higher altitudes during spring and summer, follow a similar migratory pattern to this day. From 11,000 to about 500 years ago, there is little evidence of change in the migratory patterns amongst the Native American groups in the region and no evidence that indicates any permanent human settlement.

When white American colonists first entered the region in the first decade of the 19th century, they encountered the eastern tribes of the Shoshone people. Most of the Shoshone that lived in the mountain vastness of the greater Yellowstone region continued to be pedestrian while other groups of Shoshone that resided in lower elevations had limited use of horses. The mountain-dwelling Shoshone were known as "Sheep-eaters" or "Tukudika" as they referred to themselves, since a staple of their diet was the Bighorn Sheep. The Shoshones continued to follow the same migratory pattern as their predecessors and have been documented as having a close spiritual relationship with the Teton Range. Several stone enclosures on some of the peaks, including on the upper slopes of Grand Teton (known simply as The Enclosure) are thought to have been used by Shoshone during vision quests. The Teton and Yellowstone region Shoshone relocated to the Wind River Indian Reservation after it was established in 1868.

Fur trade exploration
The Lewis and Clark Expedition (1804–1806) passed well north of the Grand Teton region. During their return trip from the Pacific Ocean, expedition member John Colter was given an early discharge so he could join two fur trappers who were heading west in search of beaver pelts. Colter was later hired by Manuel Lisa to lead fur trappers and explore the region around the Yellowstone River. During the winter of 1807/08, Colter passed through Jackson Hole and was the first Caucasian to see the Teton Range. Lewis and Clark expedition co-leader William Clark produced a map based on the previous expedition and included the explorations of John Colter in 1807, apparently based on discussions between Clark and Colter when the two met in St. Louis, Missouri in 1810. Another map attributed to William Clark indicates John Colter entered Jackson Hole from the northeast, crossing the Continental Divide at either Togwotee Pass or Union Pass and left the region after crossing Teton Pass, following the well established Native American trails. In 1931, the Colter Stone, a rock carved in the shape of a head with the inscription "John Colter" on one side and the year "1808" on the other, was discovered in a field in Tetonia, Idaho, which is west of Teton Pass. The Colter Stone has not been authenticated to have been created by John Colter and may have been the work of later expeditions to the region.

John Colter is widely considered the first mountain man and, like those that came to the Jackson Hole region over the next 30 years, he was there primarily for the profitable fur trapping; the region was rich with the highly sought after pelts of beaver and other fur-bearing animals. Between 1810 and 1812, the Astorians traveled through Jackson Hole and crossed Teton Pass as they headed east in 1812. After 1810, American and British fur trading companies were in competition for control of the North American fur trade, and American sovereignty over the region was not secured until the signing of the Oregon Treaty in 1846. One party employed by the British North West Company and led by explorer Donald Mackenzie entered Jackson Hole from the west in 1818 or 1819. The Tetons, as well as the valley west of the Teton Range known today as Pierre's Hole, may have been named by French-speaking Iroquois or French Canadian trappers that were part of Mackenzie's party. Earlier parties had referred to the most prominent peaks of the Teton Range as the Pilot Knobs. The French trappers' les trois tétons (the three breasts) was later shortened to the Tetons.

Formed in the mid-1820s, the Rocky Mountain Fur Company partnership included Jedediah Smith, William Sublette, and David Edward Jackson or "Davey Jackson". Jackson oversaw the trapping operations in the Teton region between 1826 and 1830. Sublette named the valley east of the Teton Range "Jackson's Hole" (later simply Jackson Hole) for Davey Jackson. As the demand for beaver fur declined and the various regions of the American West became depleted of beaver due to over trapping, American fur trading companies folded; however, individual mountain men continued to trap beaver in the region until about 1840. From the mid-1840s until 1860, Jackson Hole and the Teton Range were generally devoid of all but the small populations of Native American tribes that had already been there. Most overland human migration routes such as the Oregon and Mormon Trails crossed over South Pass, well to the south of the Teton Range, and Caucasian influence in the Teton region was minimal until the U.S. Government commenced organized explorations.

Organized exploration and settlement

The first U.S. Government-sponsored expedition to enter Jackson Hole was the 1859–60 Raynolds Expedition. Led by U.S. Army Captain William F. Raynolds and guided by mountain man Jim Bridger, it included naturalist F. V. Hayden, who later led other expeditions to the region. The expedition had been charged with exploring the Yellowstone region, but encountered difficulties crossing mountain passes due to snow. Bridger ended up guiding the expedition south over Union Pass then following the Gros Ventre River drainage to the Snake River and leaving the region over Teton Pass. Organized exploration of the region was halted during the American Civil War but resumed when F. V. Hayden led the well-funded Hayden Geological Survey of 1871. In 1872, Hayden oversaw explorations in Yellowstone, while a branch of his expedition known as the Snake River Division was led by James Stevenson and explored the Teton region. Along with Stevenson was photographer William Henry Jackson who took the first photographs of the Teton Range. The Hayden Geological Survey named many of the mountains and lakes in the region. The explorations by early mountain men and subsequent expeditions failed to identify any sources of economically viable mineral wealth. Nevertheless, small groups of prospectors set up claims and mining operations on several of the creeks and rivers. By 1900 all organized efforts to retrieve minerals had been abandoned.
Though the Teton Range was never permanently inhabited, pioneers began settling in the Jackson Hole valley to the east of the range in 1884. These earliest homesteaders were mostly single men who endured long winters, short growing seasons and rocky soils that were hard to cultivate. The region was most suited for the cultivation of hay and cattle ranching. By 1890, Jackson Hole had an estimated permanent population of 60. Menor's Ferry was built in 1892 near present-day Moose, Wyoming to provide access for wagons to the west side of the Snake River. Ranching increased significantly from 1900 to 1920, but a series of agricultural related economic downturns in the early 1920s left many ranchers destitute. Beginning in the 1920s, the automobile provided faster and easier access to areas of natural beauty and old military roads into Jackson Hole over Teton and Togwotee Passes were improved to accommodate the increased vehicle traffic. In response to the increased tourism, dude ranches were established, some new and some from existing cattle ranches, so urbanized travelers could experience the life of a cattleman.

Establishment of the park

To the north of Jackson Hole, Yellowstone National Park had been established in 1872, and by the close of the 19th century, conservationists wanted to expand the boundaries of that park to include at least the Teton Range. By 1907, in an effort to regulate water flow for irrigation purposes, the United States Bureau of Reclamation had constructed a log crib dam at the Snake River outlet of Jackson Lake. This dam failed in 1910 and a new concrete Jackson Lake Dam replaced it by 1911. The dam was further enlarged in 1916, raising lake waters  as part of the Minidoka Project, designed to provide irrigation for agriculture in the state of Idaho. Further dam construction plans for other lakes in the Teton Range alarmed Yellowstone National Park superintendent Horace Albright, who sought to block such efforts. Jackson Hole residents were opposed to an expansion of Yellowstone, but were more in favor of the establishment of a separate national park which would include the Teton Range and six lakes at the base of the mountains. After congressional approval, President Calvin Coolidge signed the executive order establishing the  Grand Teton National Park on February 26, 1929.

The valley of Jackson Hole remained primarily in private ownership when John D. Rockefeller Jr. and his wife visited the region in the late 1920s. Horace Albright and Rockefeller discussed ways to preserve Jackson Hole from commercial exploitation, and in consequence, Rockefeller started buying Jackson Hole properties through the Snake River Land Company to later turn them over to the National Park Service. In 1930, this plan was revealed to the residents of the region and was met with strong disapproval. Congressional efforts to prevent the expansion of Grand Teton National Park ended up putting the Snake River Land Company's holdings in limbo. By 1942 Rockefeller had become increasingly impatient that his purchased property might never be added to the park, and wrote to the Secretary of the Interior Harold L. Ickes that he was considering selling the land to another party. Secretary Ickes recommended to President Franklin Roosevelt that the Antiquities Act, which permitted presidents to set aside land for protection without the approval of Congress, be used to establish a national monument in Jackson Hole. Roosevelt created the  Jackson Hole National Monument in 1943, using the land donated from the Snake River Land Company and adding additional property from Teton National Forest. The monument and park were adjacent to each other and both were administered by the National Park Service, but the monument designation ensured no funding allotment, nor provided a level of resource protection equal to the park. Members of Congress repeatedly attempted to have the new national monument abolished.

After the end of World War II, national public sentiment was in favor of adding the monument to the park, and though there was still much local opposition, the monument and park were combined in 1950. In recognition of John D. Rockefeller, Jr.'s efforts to establish and then expand Grand Teton National Park, a  parcel of land between Grand Teton and Yellowstone National Parks was added to the National Park Service in 1972. This land and the road from the southern boundary of the park to West Thumb in Yellowstone National Park was named the John D. Rockefeller Jr. Memorial Parkway. The Rockefeller family owned the JY Ranch, which bordered Grand Teton National Park to the southwest. In November 2007, the Rockefeller family transferred ownership of the ranch to the park for the establishment of the Laurance S. Rockefeller Preserve, which was dedicated on June 21, 2008.

History of mountaineering

During the last 25 years of the 19th century, the mountains of the Teton Range became a focal point for explorers wanting to claim the first ascents of the peaks. However, white explorers may not have been the first to climb many of the peaks and the earliest first ascent of even the formidable Grand Teton itself might have been achieved long before written history documented it. Nathaniel P. Langford and James Stevenson, both members of the Hayden Geological Survey of 1872, found The Enclosure during their early attempt to summit Grand Teton. Langford claimed that he and Stevenson climbed Grand Teton, but were vague as to whether they had made it to the summit. Their reported obstacles and sightings were never corroborated by later parties. Langford and Stevenson likely did not get much further than The Enclosure. The first ascent of Grand Teton that is substantiated was made by William O. Owen, Frank Petersen, John Shive and Franklin Spencer Spalding on August 11, 1898. Owen had made two previous attempts on the peak and after publishing several accounts of this first ascent, discredited any claim that Langford and Stevenson had ever reached beyond The Enclosure in 1872. The disagreement over which party first reached the top of Grand Teton may be the greatest controversy in the history of American mountaineering. After 1898 no other ascents of Grand Teton were recorded until 1923.

By the mid-1930s, more than a dozen different climbing routes had been established on Grand Teton including the northeast ridge in 1931 by Glenn Exum. Glenn Exum teamed up with another noted climber named Paul Petzoldt to found the Exum Mountain Guides in 1931. Of the other major peaks on the Teton Range, all were climbed by the late 1930s including Mount Moran in 1922 and Mount Owen in 1930 by Fritiof Fryxell and others after numerous previous attempts had failed. Both Middle and South Teton were first climbed on the same day, August 29, 1923, by a group of climbers led by Albert R. Ellingwood. New routes on the peaks were explored as safety equipment and skills improved and eventually climbs rated at above 5.9 on the Yosemite Decimal System difficulty scale were established on Grand Teton. The classic climb following the route first pioneered by Owen, known as the Owen-Spalding route, is rated at 5.4 due to a combination of concerns beyond the gradient alone. Rock climbing and bouldering had become popular in the park by the mid 20th century. In the late 1950s, gymnast John Gill came to the park and started climbing large boulders near Jenny Lake. Gill approached climbing from a gymnastics perspective and while in the Tetons became the first known climber in history to use gymnastic chalk to improve handholds and to keep hands dry while climbing. During the latter decades of the 20th century, extremely difficult cliffs were explored including some in Death Canyon, and by the mid-1990s, 800 different climbing routes had been documented for the various peaks and canyon cliffs.

Park management

Grand Teton National Park is one of the ten most visited national parks in the U.S., with an annual average of 2.75 million visitors in the period from 2007 to 2016, with 3.27 million visiting in 2016. The National Park Service is a federal agency of the United States Department of the Interior and manages both Grand Teton National Park and the John D. Rockefeller Jr. Memorial Parkway. Grand Teton National Park has an average of 100 permanent and 180 seasonal employees. The park also manages 27 concession contracts that provide services such as lodging, restaurants, mountaineering guides, dude ranching, fishing and a boat shuttle on Jenny Lake. The National Park Service works closely with other federal agencies such as the U.S. Forest Service, the U.S. Fish and Wildlife Service, the Bureau of Reclamation, and also, in consequence of Jackson Hole Airport's presence in the park, the Federal Aviation Administration. Initial construction of the airstrip north of the town of Jackson was completed in the 1930s. When Jackson Hole National Monument was designated, the airport was inside it. After the monument and park were combined, the Jackson Hole Airport became the only commercial airport within an American national park. Jackson Hole Airport has some of the strictest noise abatement regulations of any airport in the U.S. The airport has night flight curfews and overflight restrictions, with pilots being expected to approach and depart the airport along the east, south or southwest flight corridors. As of 2010, 110 privately owned property inholdings, many belonging to the state of Wyoming, are located within Grand Teton National Park. Efforts to purchase or trade these inholdings for other federal lands are ongoing and through partnerships with other entities, 10 million dollars is hoped to be raised to acquire private inholdings by 2016.

The purchase price amounted to 46 million dollars ($23 million allocated from the Land and Water Conservation Fund and the last $23 million was raised in private funds from 5,421 donors). The proceeds of the sale will benefit Wyoming Public Schools. Grand Teton National Park is still in negotiations for the purchase of the Kelly Parcel which totals an additional 640 acres from Wyoming. Moulton Ranch Cabins, a  inholding along the historic Mormon Row was sold to the Grand Teton National Park Foundation in 2018. In 2020 the National Park Service in partnership with the Conservation Fund acquired a  parcel located within Grand Teton National Park. This parcel is located near the Granite Canyon Entrance Station.

Geography

Grand Teton National Park is located in the northwestern region of the U.S. state of Wyoming. To the north the park is bordered by the John D. Rockefeller Jr. Memorial Parkway, which is administered by Grand Teton National Park. The scenic highway with the same name passes from the southern boundary of Grand Teton National Park to West Thumb in Yellowstone National Park. Most of the Jackson Hole valley and virtually all the major mountain peaks of the Teton Range are within the park. The Jedediah Smith Wilderness of Caribou-Targhee National Forest lies along the western boundary and includes the western slopes of the Teton Range. To the northeast and east lie the Teton Wilderness and Gros Ventre Wilderness of Bridger-Teton National Forest. The National Elk Refuge is to the southeast, and migrating herds of elk winter there. Privately owned land borders the park to the south and southwest. Grand Teton National Park, along with Yellowstone National Park, surrounding National Forests and related protected areas constitute the  Greater Yellowstone Ecosystem. The Greater Yellowstone Ecosystem spans portions of three states and is one of the largest intact mid-latitude ecosystems remaining on Earth.

Teton Range

The youngest mountain range in the Rocky Mountains, the Teton Range began forming between 6 and 9 million years ago. The range tilts westward, rising abruptly above Jackson Hole valley which lies to the east but more gradually into Teton Valley to the west. Most of the displacement of the fault occurred in the last 2 million years. While the fault has experienced up to 7.5-earthquake magnitude events since it formed, it has been relatively quiescent during historical periods, with only a few 5.0-magnitude or greater earthquakes known to have occurred since 1850.

Eight of these peaks between Avalanche and Cascade Canyons make up the often-photographed Cathedral Group. To the north of Mount Moran, the range eventually merges into the high altitude Yellowstone Plateau. South of the central Cathedral Group the Teton Range tapers off near Teton Pass and blends into the Snake River Range.

West to east trending canyons provides easier access by foot into the heart of the range as no vehicular roads traverse the range except at Teton Pass, which is south of the park. Carved by a combination of glacier activity as well as numerous streams, the canyons are at their lowest point along the eastern margin of the range at Jackson Hole. Flowing from higher to lower elevations, the glaciers created more than a dozen U-shaped valleys throughout the range. Cascade Canyon is sandwiched between Mount Owen and Teewinot Mountain to the south and Symmetry Spire to the north and is situated immediately west of Jenny Lake. North to south, Webb, Moran, Paintbrush, Cascade, Death and Granite Canyons slice through Teton Range.

Jackson Hole 

The valley sits east of the Teton Range and is vertically displaced downward , making the Teton Fault and its parallel twin on the east side of the valley normal faults with the Jackson Hole block being the hanging wall and the Teton Mountain block being the footwall. Grand Teton National Park contains the major part of both blocks. Erosion of the range provided sediment in the valley so the topographic relief is only . Jackson Hole is comparatively flat, with only a modest increase in altitude south to north; however, a few isolated buttes such as Blacktail Butte and hills including Signal Mountain dot the valley floor. In addition to a few outcroppings, the Snake River has eroded terraces into Jackson Hole. Southeast of Jackson Lake, glacial depressions known as kettles are numerous. The kettles were formed when ice situated under gravel outwash from ice sheets melted as the glaciers retreated.

Lakes and rivers 

Most of the lakes in the park were formed by glaciers and the largest of these lakes are located at the base of the Teton Range. Though Jackson Lake is natural, the Jackson Lake Dam was constructed at its outlet before the creation of the park, and the lake level was raised almost  consequently. East of the Jackson Lake Lodge lies Emma Matilda and Two Ocean Lakes. South of Jackson Lake, Leigh, Jenny, Bradley, Taggart and Phelps Lakes rest at the outlets of the canyons which lead into the Teton Range. Within the Teton Range, small alpine lakes in cirques are common, and there are more than 100 scattered throughout the high country. The park is not noted for large waterfalls; however,  Hidden Falls just west of Jenny Lake is easy to reach after a short hike.

From its headwaters on Two Ocean Plateau in Yellowstone National Park, the Snake River flows north to south through the park, entering Jackson Lake near the boundary of Grand Teton National Park and John D. Rockefeller Jr. Memorial Parkway. The Snake River then flows through the spillways of the Jackson Lake Dam and from there southward through Jackson Hole, exiting the park just west of the Jackson Hole Airport. The largest lakes in the park all drain either directly or by tributary streams into the Snake River. Major tributaries which flow into the Snake River include Pacific Creek and Buffalo Fork near Moran and the Gros Ventre River at the southern border of the park. The Snake River creates braids and channels in sections where the gradients are lower and in steeper sections, erodes and undercuts the cobblestone terraces once deposited by glaciers.

Glaciation 

The major peaks of the Teton Range were carved into their current shapes by long-vanished glaciers. This heavy glaciation is unrelated to the uplift of the range itself and is instead part of a period of global cooling known as the Quaternary glaciation. Beginning with the Buffalo Glaciation and followed by the Bull Lake and then the Pinedale glaciation, which ended roughly 15,000 years ago, the landscape was greatly impacted by glacial activity. During the Pinedale glaciation, the landscape visible today was created as glaciers from the Yellowstone Plateau flowed south and formed Jackson Lake, while smaller glaciers descending from the Teton Range pushed rock moraines out from the canyons and left behind lakes near the base of the mountains. The peaks themselves were carved into horns and arêtes and the canyons were transformed from water-eroded V-shapes to glacier-carved U-shaped valleys. Approximately a dozen glaciers currently exist in the park, but they are not ancient as they were all reestablished sometime between 1400 and 1850 AD during the Little Ice Age. Of these more recent glaciers, the largest is Teton Glacier, which sits below the northeast face of Grand Teton. Teton Glacier is also the best-studied glacier in the range, and researchers concluded in 2005 that the glacier could disappear in 30 to 75 years. West of the Cathedral Group near Hurricane Pass, Schoolroom Glacier is tiny but has well-defined terminal and lateral moraines, a small proglacial lake, and other typical glacier features near each other.

Geology 

Grand Teton National Park has some of the most ancient rocks found in any American national park. The oldest rocks dated so far are 2,680 ± 12 million years old, though even older rocks are believed to exist in the park. Formed during the Archean Eon (4 to 2.5 billion years ago), these metamorphic rocks include gneiss, schist and amphibolites. Metamorphic rocks are the most common types found in the northern and southern sections of the Teton Range. 2,545 million years ago, the metamorphic rocks were intruded by igneous granitic rocks, which are now visible in the central Tetons including Grand Teton and the nearby peaks. The light-colored granites of the central Teton Range contrast with the darker metamorphic gneiss found on the flanks of Mount Moran to the north. Magma intrusions of diabase rocks 765 million years ago left dikes that can be seen on the east face of Mount Moran and Middle Teton. Granite and pegmatite intrusions also worked their way into fissures in the older gneiss. Precambrian rocks in Jackson Hole are buried deep under comparatively recent Tertiary volcanic and sedimentary deposits, as well as Pleistocene glacial deposits.

By the close of the Precambrian, the region was intermittently submerged under shallow seas, and for 500 million years various types of sedimentary rocks were formed. During the Paleozoic (542 to 251 million years ago) sandstone, shale, limestone and dolomite were deposited. Though most of these sedimentary rocks have since eroded away from the central Teton Range, they are still evident on the northern, southern and western flanks of the range. One notable exception is the sandstone Flathead Formation which continues to cap Mount Moran. Sedimentary layering of rocks in Alaska Basin, which is on the western border of Grand Teton National Park, chronicles a 120-million-year period of sedimentary deposition. Fossils found in the sedimentary rocks in the park include algae, brachiopods and trilobites. Sedimentary deposition continued during the Mesozoic (250–66 million years ago) and the coal seams found in the sedimentary rock strata indicate the region was densely forested during that era. During the late Cretaceous, a volcanic arc west of the region deposited fine-grained ash that later formed into bentonite, an important mineral resource.

From the end of the Mesozoic to the present, the region went through a series of uplifts and erosional sequences. Commencing 66 million years ago the Laramide orogeny was a period of mountain-building and erosion in western North America that created the ancestral Rocky Mountains. This cycle of uplift and erosion left behind one of the most complete non-marine Cenozoic rock sequences found in North America. Conglomerate rocks composed of quartzite and interspersed with mudstone and sandstones were deposited during erosion from a now vanished mountain range that existed to the northwest of the current Teton Range. These deposits also have trace quantities of gold and mercury. During the Eocene and Oligocene, volcanic eruptions from the ancestral Absaroka Range buried the region under various volcanic deposits. Sedimentary basins developed in the region due to drop faulting, creating an ancestral Jackson Hole and by the Pliocene (10 million years ago), an ancestral Jackson Lake known as Teewinot Lake. During the Quaternary, landslides, erosion and glacial activity deposited soils and rock debris throughout the Snake River valley of Jackson Hole and left behind terminal moraines which impound the current lakes. The most recent example of rapid alteration to the landscape occurred in 1925 just east of the park when the Gros Ventre landslide was triggered by spring melt from a heavy snowpack as well as heavy rain.

Ecology

Flora 

Grand Teton National Park and the surrounding region host over 1,000 species of vascular plants. Additionally, wetlands near some lakes and in the valley floor adjacent to rivers and streams cover large expanses, especially along the Snake River near Oxbow Bend near Moran and Willow Flats near the Jackson Lake Lodge. Altitude, available soils, wildfire incidence, avalanches and human activities have a direct impact on the types of plant species in an immediate area. Where these various niches overlap is known as an ecotone.

The range of altitude in Grand Teton National Park impacts the types of plant species found at various elevations. In this treeless region, hundreds of species of grass, wildflower, moss and lichen are found. In the subalpine region from the tree line to the base of the mountains, whitebark pine, limber pine, subalpine fir, and Engelmann spruce are dominant. In the valley floor, lodgepole pine is most common but Rocky Mountain Douglas-fir, and blue spruce inhabit drier areas, while aspen, cottonwood, alder, and willow are more commonly found around lakes, streams, and wetlands. However, the tablelands above the Snake River channel are mostly sagebrush plains and in terms of acreage are the most widespread habitat in the park. The sagebrush plains or flats have 100 species of grasses and wildflowers. Slightly more elevated sections of the plains of the northern sections of Jackson Hole form forest islands with one such obvious example being Timbered Island. In this ecotone, forested islands surrounded by sagebrush expanses provide shelter for various animal species during the day and nearby grasses for nighttime foraging.

While the flora of Grand Teton National Park is generally healthy, the whitebark pine, and to a lesser degree the lodgepole pine, are considered at risk. In the case of the whitebark pine, an invasive species of fungus known as white pine blister rust weakens the tree, making it more susceptible to destruction from endemic mountain pine beetles. Whitebark pines generally thrive at elevations above  and produce large seeds that are high in fat content and an important food source for various species such as the  grizzly bear, red squirrel and Clark's nutcracker. The species is considered to be a keystone and a foundation species; keystone in that its "ecological role (is) disproportionately large relative to its abundance" and foundation in that it has a paramount role that "defines ecosystem structure, function, and process". Whitebark pine has generally had a lower incidence of blister rust infection throughout the Greater Yellowstone Ecosystem than in other regions such as Glacier National Park and the Cascade Range. The incidence of blister rust on whitebark pines in Yellowstone National Park is slightly lower than in Grand Teton. Though blister rust is not in itself the cause of increased mortality, its weakening effect on trees allows native pine beetles to have more easily infest the trees, increasing mortality. While general practice in national parks is to allow nature to take its course, the alarming trend of increased disease and mortality of the vital whitebark pine trees has sparked a collaborative effort amongst various government entities to intervene to protect the species.

Fauna 

Sixty-one species of mammals have been recorded in Grand Teton National Park. This includes the gray wolf, which had been extirpated from the region by the early 1900s but migrated into the Grand Teton National Park from adjacent Yellowstone National Park after the species had been reintroduced there. The re-establishment of the wolves has ensured that every indigenous mammal species now exists in the park. In addition to gray wolves, another 17 species of carnivores reside within Grand Teton National Park including grizzlies and the more commonly seen American black bear. Relatively common sightings of coyote, river otter, marten and badger and occasional sightings of cougar, lynx and wolverine are reported annually. A number of rodent species exist including yellow-bellied marmot, least chipmunk, muskrat, beaver, Uinta ground squirrel, pika, snowshoe hare, porcupine, and six species of bats.

Of the larger mammals, the most common are elk, which exist in the thousands.  Their migration route between the National Elk Refuge and Yellowstone National Park is through Grand Teton National Park, so while easily seen anytime of the year, they are most numerous in the spring and fall. Other ungulates in the park include moose, bison, and pronghorn—the fastest land mammal in the western hemisphere.  The park's moose tend to stay near waterways and wetlands. Between 100 and 125 bighorn sheep dwell in the alpine and rocky zones of the peaks.

Over 300 species of birds have been sighted in the park including the calliope hummingbird, the smallest bird species in mainland North America, as well as trumpeter swans, which is North America's largest waterfowl. In addition to trumpeter swans, another 30 species of waterfowl have been recorded including blue-winged teal, common merganser, American wigeon and the colorful but reclusive harlequin duck which is occasionally spotted in Cascade Canyon. Both bald and golden eagles and other birds of prey such as the osprey, red-tailed hawk, American kestrel and occasional sightings of peregrine falcon have been reported. Of the 14 species of owls reported, the most common is the great horned owl, though the boreal owl and great grey owl are also seen occasionally. A dozen species of woodpeckers have been reported, as have a similar number of species of warblers, plovers and gulls. The vocal and gregarious black-billed magpie frequents campgrounds while Steller's jay and Clark's nutcracker are found in the backcountry. The sage covered plains of Jackson Hole are favored areas for sage grouse, Brewer's sparrow and sage thrashers, while the wetlands are frequented by great blue heron, American white pelican, sandhill crane and on rare occasions its endangered relative, the whooping crane.

The Snake River fine-spotted cutthroat trout (or Snake River cutthroat trout) is the only native trout species in Grand Teton National Park. It is also the only subspecies of cutthroat trout that is exclusively native to large streams and rivers. Various researchers have not been able to identify any genetic differences between the Snake River fine-spotted cutthroat trout and the Yellowstone cutthroat trout, though in terms of appearances, the Snake River subspecies has much smaller spots that cover a greater portion of the body, and the two subspecies inhabit different ecological niches. The Snake River fine-spotted cutthroat trout was identified by some researchers as a separate subspecies by the mid-1990s, and is managed as a distinct subspecies by the state of Wyoming, but is not yet recognized as such by the neighboring states of Idaho and Montana. Snake River fine-spotted cutthroat trout is found only in the Snake River and tributaries below the Jackson Lake dam to the Palisades Reservoir in Idaho. Other non-native species of trout such as the rainbow trout and lake trout were introduced by the Wyoming Fish and Game Department or migrated out of Yellowstone. Today five trout species inhabit park waters. Native species of fish include the mountain whitefish, longnose dace, mountain sucker and non-native species include the Utah chub and Arctic grayling.

Only four species of reptiles are documented in the park: three species of snakes which are the wandering garter snake, the less commonly seen valley garter snake, and rubber boa, as well as one lizard species, the northern sagebrush lizard, that was first reported in 1992. None of the species are venomous. Six amphibian species have been documented including the Columbia spotted frog, boreal chorus frog, tiger salamander and the increasingly rare boreal toad and northern leopard frog. A sixth amphibian species, the bullfrog, was introduced. An estimated 10,000 insect species frequent the park; they pollinate plants, provide a food source for birds, fish, mammals, and other animals, and help in the decomposition of wood. In one example of the importance of insects to the ecosystem, swarms of Army cutworm moths die in huge numbers after mating and provide a high fat and protein diet for bears and other predators. One study concluded that when this moth species is most available, bears consume 40,000 moths per day which is roughly 20,000 kcal/day.

Grand Teton National Park permits the hunting of elk to keep the populations of that species regulated. This provision was included in the legislation that combined Jackson Hole National Monument and Grand Teton National Park in 1950. While some national parks in Alaska permit subsistence hunting by indigenous natives and a few other National Park Service managed areas allow hunting under highly regulated circumstances, hunting in American national parks is not generally allowed. In Grand Teton National Park, hunters are required to obtain Wyoming hunting licenses and be deputized as park rangers. Hunting is restricted to areas east of the Snake River, and north of Moran, the hunt is permitted only east of U.S. Route 89. Proponents of continuing the elk hunt, which occurs in the fall, argue that the elk herd would become overpopulated without it, leading to vegetation degradation from overgrazing elk herds. Opponents cite that there has been an increase of predators such as the wolf and grizzly bear in Grand Teton National Park, rendering the annual hunt unnecessary and exposing hunters to attacks by grizzly bears as they become accustomed to feeding on remains left behind from the hunt.

Fire ecology 

The role of wildfire is an important one for plant and animal species diversity. Many tree species have evolved to mainly germinate after a wildfire. Regions of the park that have experienced wildfire in historical times have greater species diversity after reestablishment than those regions that have not been influenced by fire. Though the Yellowstone fires of 1988 had minimal impact on Grand Teton National Park, studies conducted before and reaffirmed after that event concluded that the suppression of natural wildfires during the middle part of the 20th century decreased plant species diversity and natural regeneration of plant communities. One study conducted 15 years before the 1988 Yellowstone National Park fires concluded that human suppression of wildfire had adversely impacted Aspen tree groves and other forest types. The majority of conifer species in Grand Teton National Park are heavily dependent on wildfire and this is particularly true of the Lodgepole Pine. Though extremely hot canopy or crown fires tend to kill Lodgepole Pine seeds, lower severity surface fires usually result in a higher post-wildfire regeneration of this species. In accordance with a better understanding of the role wildfire plays in the environment, the National Park Service and other land management agencies have developed Fire Management Plans which provide a strategy for wildfire management and are expected to best enhance the natural ecosystem.

Air and water quality 
Grand Teton National Park is more than  air distance from any major urban or industrial area, and localized human activities have generally had a very low environmental impact on the surrounding region. However, levels of ammonium and nitrogen have been trending slightly upwards due to deposition from rain and snow that is believed to originate from regional agricultural activities. Additionally, there has also been a slight increase in mercury and pesticides that have been detected in snow and some alpine lakes. Ozone and haze may be impacting overall visibility levels. Grand Teton National Park, in partnership with other agencies, erected the first air quality monitoring station in the park in 2011. The station is designed to check for various pollutants as well as ozone levels and weather.

A 2005 study of the water of Jackson, Jenny, and Taggart Lakes indicated that all three of these lakes had virtually pristine water quality. Of the three lakes, only on Taggart Lake are motorized boats prohibited, yet little difference in water quality was detected in the three lakes. In a study published in 2002, the Snake River was found to have better overall water quality than other river systems in Wyoming, and low levels of pollution from anthropogenic sources.

Climate
According to the Köppen climate classification system, Grand Teton National Park has a humid continental climate (Dfb).

Recreation

Mountaineering 
Grand Teton National Park is a popular destination for mountain and rock climbers partly because the mountains are easily accessible by road. Trails are well marked and routes to the summits of most peaks are long established, and for the experienced and fit, most peaks can be climbed in one day. From these passes, the climbs follow routes that require varying skill levels. Climbers do not need a permit but are encouraged to voluntarily register their climbing plans with the National Park Service and inform associates of their itinerary. Any climb requiring an overnight stay in the backcountry does require a permit. Climbers are essentially on their own to determine their own skill levels and are encouraged to not take unnecessary risks. The Exum Mountain Guides, which is considered one of the finest mountaineering guide services in the U.S., as well as the Jackson Hole Mountain Guides, offer instruction and climbing escorts for those who are less experienced or unfamiliar with various routes.

An average of 4,000 climbers per year make an attempt to summit Grand Teton and most ascend up Garnet Canyon to a mountain pass called the Lower Saddle, which is between Grand Teton and Middle Teton. From the Lower Saddle, climbers often follow the Owen-Spalding or Exum Ridge routes to the top of Grand Teton though there are 38 distinct routes to the summit. The north face route to the summit of Grand Teton is a world-renowned climb involving a dozen distinct pitches and is rated at grade 5.8 in difficulty for the  vertical ascent. On a connecting ridge and just north of Grand Teton lies Mount Owen, and though lower in altitude, this peak is considered more difficult to ascend. Middle Teton is another popular climb that is most easily summited from a saddle between it and South Teton. Well, north of Grand Teton lies Mount Moran, which is further from trailheads and more difficult to access and ascend. The Direct South Buttress of Mount Moran provides a vertical mile of climbing that was considered the most difficult climb in the U.S. when first accomplished in 1953. Other popular climbing destinations include Buck Mountain, Symmetry Spire,  Mount Saint John, Mount Wister, Teewinot Mountain and Nez Perce Peak and each mountain has at least six established routes to their summits.

Camping and hiking 

Grand Teton National Park has five front-country vehicular access campgrounds. The largest is the Colter Bay and Gros Ventre campgrounds, and each has 350 campsites which can accommodate large recreational vehicles. Lizard Creek and Signal Mountain campgrounds have 60 and 86 campsites respectively, while the smaller Jenny Lake campground has only 49 sites for tent use only. Additionally, full hookups for recreational vehicles are at the concessionaire-managed 112 campsites at Colter Bay Village and another 100 at Flagg Ranch in the John D. Rockefeller Memorial Parkway. Though all front-country campgrounds are only open from late spring to late fall, primitive winter camping is permitted at Colter Bay near the visitor center.

All campsites accessible only on foot or by horseback are considered backcountry campsites and they are available by permit only, but camping is allowed in most of these backcountry zones year-round. The National Park Service has a combination of specific sites and zones for backcountry camping with a set carrying capacity of overnight stays per zone to protect the resources from overcrowding. Open fires are not permitted in the backcountry and all food must be stored in an Interagency Grizzly Bear Committee approved bear-resistant container. As of 2012, only four brands of bear-resistant containers had been approved for use in the Grand Teton National Park backcountry. Additionally, hikers may use an approved bear spray to elude aggressive bears.

The park has  of hiking trails, ranging in difficulty from easy to strenuous. The easiest hiking trails are located in the valley, where the altitude changes are generally minimal. Several other trails link Hermitage Point with Emma Matilda Lake and Two Ocean Lake Trails, also considered to be relatively easy hikes in the Jackson Lake Lodge area. Other easy hikes include the Valley Trail which runs from Trapper Lake in the north to the south park boundary near Teton Village and the Jenny Lake Trail which circles the lake. Ranging from moderate to strenuous in difficulty, trails leading into the canyons are rated based on distance and more importantly on the amount of elevation change. Horses and pack animals are permitted on almost all trails in the park; however, there are only five designated backcountry camping locations for pack animals and these campsites are far from the high mountain passes. Bicycles are limited to vehicle roadways only and the park has widened some roads to provide a safer biking experience. A paved multi-use pathway opened in 2009 and provides non-motorized biking access from the town of Jackson to South Jenny Lake.

Boating and fishing 

Grand Teton National Park allows boating on all the lakes in Jackson Hole, but motorized boats can only be used on Jackson and Jenny Lakes. While there is no maximum horsepower limit on Jackson Lake (though there is a noise restriction), Jenny Lake is restricted to 10 horsepower. Only non-motorized boats are permitted on Bearpaw, Bradley, Emma Matilda, Leigh, Phelps, String, Taggart and Two Ocean Lakes. There are four designated boat launches located on Jackson Lake and one on Jenny Lake. Additionally, sailboats, windsurfers, and water skiing are only allowed on Jackson Lake and no jet skis are permitted on any of the park waterways. All boats are required to comply with various safety regulations including personal flotation devices for each passenger. Only non-motorized watercraft are permitted on the Snake River. All other waterways in the park are off limits to boating, and this includes all alpine lakes and tributary streams of the Snake River.

In 2010, Grand Teton National Park started requiring all boats to display an Aquatic Invasive Species decal issued by the Wyoming Game and Fish Department or a Yellowstone National Park boat permit. In an effort to keep the park waterways free of various invasive species such as the Zebra mussel and whirling disease, boaters are expected to abide by certain regulations including displaying a self-certification of compliance on the dashboard of any vehicle attached to an empty boat trailer.

Grand Teton National Park fisheries are managed by the Wyoming Fish and Game Department and a Wyoming state fishing license is required to fish all waterways in Grand Teton National Park. There are also restrictions as to the seasonal accessibility to certain areas as well as the types of bait and fishing tackle permitted.

Winter activities 

Visitors are allowed to snowshoe and do cross-country skiing and are not restricted to trails. The Teton Park Road between the Taggart Lake trailhead to Signal Mountain Campground is closed to vehicular traffic during the winter and this section of the road is groomed for skiing and snowshoeing traffic. The park service offers guided snowshoe tours daily from the main headquarters located in Moose, Wyoming. Overnight camping is allowed in the winter in the backcountry with a permit and visitors should inquire about avalanche dangers.

The only location in Grand Teton National Park where snowmobiles are permitted is on Jackson Lake. The National Park Service requires that all snowmobiles use "Best Available Technology" (BAT) and lists various models of snowmobiles that are permitted, all of which are deemed to provide the least amount of air pollution and maximize noise abatement. Additionally, snowmobile use is for the purposes of accessing ice fishing locations only. Snowmobile access was permitted between Moran Junction and Flagg Ranch adjacent to the John D. Rockefeller Jr. Memorial Parkway so that travelers using the Continental Divide Snowmobile Trail could traverse between Bridger-Teton National Forest and Yellowstone National Park. However, in 2009, winter use planners closed this since unguided snowmobile access into Yellowstone National Park was also discontinued.

Tourism

Visitor centers 

The Craig Thomas Discovery and Visitor Center adjacent to the park headquarters at Moose, Wyoming, is open year-round. Opened in 2007 to replace an old, inadequate visitor center, the facility is named for the late U.S. Senator Craig Thomas and designed by acclaimed architect, Bohlin Cywinski Jackson. It was financed with a combination of federal grants and private donations. An adjoining 154-seat auditorium was opened to the public in April 2011. To the north at Colter Bay Village on Jackson Lake, the Colter Bay Visitor Center & Indian Arts Museum is open from the beginning of May to the early October. The Colter Bay Visitor Center & Indian Arts Museum has housed the David T. Vernon Indian Arts Exhibit since 1972. The Colter Bay Visitor Center was built in 1956 and was determined in 2005 to be substandard for the proper care and display of the Indian art collection. During the winter of 2011–2012, a $150,000 renovation project was completed at the center and a portion of the arts collection was made available for viewing when the center opened for the season in May 2012.

South of Moose on the Moose–Wilson Road, the Laurance S. Rockefeller Preserve Center is located on land that was privately owned by Laurance S. Rockefeller and is situated on Phelps Lake. Donated to Grand Teton National Park and opened to the public in 2008, the property was once part of the JY Ranch, the first dude ranch in Jackson Hole. At Jenny Lake, the Jenny Lake Visitor Center is open from mid-May to mid-September. This visitor center is within the Jenny Lake Ranger Station Historic District and is the same structure photographer Harrison Crandall had constructed as an art studio in the 1920s.

Accommodations 
Contracted through the National Park Service, various concessionaire entities manage lodging facilities inside the park. The largest such facility is the Jackson Lake Lodge, which is managed by the Grand Teton Lodge Company. Located near Jackson Lake Dam, the Jackson Lake Lodge has a total of 385 rooms, meeting facilities, a retail shop, and a restaurant. The Grand Teton Lodge Company also manages the Jenny Lake Lodge, which consists of cabins and a restaurant, and Colter Bay Village, which has cabins, a restaurant, a grocery store, and a laundry, and a marina. South of Jackson Lake Dam, the Signal Mountain Lodge is managed by Forever Resorts and provides cabins, a marina, a gas station and a restaurant. The American Alpine Club has hostel dormitory-style accommodations primarily reserved for mountain climbers at the Grand Teton Climber's Ranch. Adjacent to the Snake River in Moose, Wyoming, Dornan's is an inholding on private land which has year-round cabin accommodations and related facilities. Lodging is also available at the Triangle X Ranch, another private inholding in the park and the last remaining dude ranch within park boundaries.

Hazards

Encountering bears is a concern in the Wind River Range. There are other concerns as well, including bugs, wildfires, adverse snow conditions and nighttime cold temperatures.

Importantly, there have been notable incidents, including accidental deaths, due to falls from steep cliffs (a misstep could be fatal in this class 4/5 terrain) and due to falling rocks, over the years, including 1993, 2007 (involving an experienced NOLS leader), 2015 and 2018. Other incidents include a seriously injured backpacker being airlifted near SquareTop Mountain in 2005, and a fatal hiker incident (from an apparent accidental fall) in 2006 that involved state search and rescue. The U.S. Forest Service does not offer updated aggregated records on the official number of fatalities in the Wind River Range.

See also
 List of national parks of the United States
 Jackson Hole Economic Symposium

References

External links 

 
 Grand Teton Association
 

 
Greater Yellowstone Ecosystem
National parks in Wyoming
National parks of the Rocky Mountains
Protected areas established in 1929
Rockefeller family
Teton County, Wyoming
Tourist attractions in Teton County, Wyoming
History of the Rocky Mountains
1929 establishments in Wyoming